Ali Ahmed El-Khateeb (born 10 October 1990) is an Egyptian badminton player.

Achievements

All African Games 
Men's doubles

African Championships 
Men's singles

Men's doubles

BWF International Challenge/Series (8 runners-up) 
Men's singles

Men's doubles

Mixed doubles

  BWF International Challenge tournament
  BWF International Series tournament
  BWF Future Series tournament

References

External links 
 

Living people
1990 births
Egyptian male badminton players
Competitors at the 2007 All-Africa Games
Competitors at the 2015 African Games
African Games silver medalists for Egypt
African Games medalists in badminton
21st-century Egyptian people